This article presents more detail of the results in the 2010 South Korean local elections, breaking down results by metropolitan mayoral and gubernatorial elections.

Metropolitan mayoral elections

Seoul

Gwangju

Daegu

Daejeon

Busan

Ulsan

Incheon

Gubernatorial elections

Gangwon-do

Gyeonggi-do

Gyeongsangnam-do

Gyeongsangbuk-do

Jeollanam-do

Jeollabuk-do

Chungcheongnam-do

Chungcheongbuk-do

Jeju-do

References

External links
 5th local elections results - the Central Election Management Committee

2010 1
South Korean
2010 in South Korea
Election results in South Korea